

Events

Pre-1600
 312 – Constantine the Great enters Rome after his victory at the Battle of the Milvian Bridge, stages a grand adventus in the city, and is met with popular jubilation. Maxentius' body is fished out of the Tiber and beheaded.
 437 – Valentinian III, Western Roman Emperor, marries Licinia Eudoxia, daughter of his cousin Theodosius II, Eastern Roman Emperor in Constantinople unifying the two branches of the House of Theodosius.
1268 – Conradin is executed along with his companion Frederick I, Margrave of Baden by Charles I of Sicily.
1390 – First trial for witchcraft in Paris leading to the death of three people.
1467 – Battle of Brustem: Charles the Bold defeats Prince-Bishopric of Liège.
1591 – Pope Innocent IX is elected.

1601–1900
1611 – Russian homage to the King of Poland, Sigismund III Vasa.
1618 – English adventurer, writer, and courtier Sir Walter Raleigh is beheaded for allegedly conspiring against James I of England.
1621 – The London Pageant of 1621 celebrates the inauguration of Edward Barkham (Lord Mayor).
1658 – Second Northern War: Naval forces of the Dutch Republic defeat the Swedes in the Battle of the Sound.
1665 – Portuguese forces defeat the Kingdom of Kongo and decapitate King António I of Kongo, also known as Nvita a Nkanga.
1675 – Leibniz makes the first use of the long s (∫) as a symbol of the integral in calculus.
1787 – Mozart's opera Don Giovanni receives its first performance in Prague.
1792 – Mount Hood (Oregon) is named after Samuel Hood, 1st Viscount Hood by Lt. William E. Broughton who sighted the mountain near the mouth of the Willamette River.
1863 – Eighteen countries meet in Geneva and agree to form the International Red Cross.
  1863   – American Civil War: Battle of Wauhatchie: Forces under Union General Ulysses S. Grant repel a Confederate attack led by General James Longstreet. Union forces thus open a supply line into Chattanooga, Tennessee.
1888 – The Convention of Constantinople is signed, guaranteeing free maritime passage through the Suez Canal during war and peace.

1901–present
1901 – In Amherst, Massachusetts, nurse Jane Toppan is arrested for murdering the Davis family of Boston with an overdose of morphine.
  1901   – Leon Czolgosz, the assassin of U.S. President William McKinley, is executed by electrocution.
1914 – Ottoman entry into World War I.
1918 – The German High Seas Fleet is incapacitated when sailors mutiny, an action which would trigger the German Revolution of 1918–19.
1921 – United States: Second trial of Sacco and Vanzetti in Boston, Massachusetts.
  1921   – The Harvard University football team loses to Centre College, ending a 25-game winning streak. This is considered one of the biggest upsets in college football.
1923 – Turkey becomes a republic following the dissolution of the Ottoman Empire.
1929 – The New York Stock Exchange crashes in what will be called the Crash of '29 or "Black Tuesday", ending the Great Bull Market of the 1920s and beginning the Great Depression.
1941 – The Holocaust: In the Kaunas Ghetto, over 10,000 Jews are shot by German occupiers at the Ninth Fort, a massacre known as the "Great Action".
1942 – The Holocaust: In the United Kingdom, leading clergymen and political figures hold a public meeting to register outrage over Nazi Germany's persecution of Jews.
1944 – The Dutch city of Breda is liberated by 1st Polish Armoured Division.
  1944   – World War II: The Soviet Red Army enters Hungary.
1948 – Israeli-Palestinian conflict: Safsaf massacre: Israeli soldiers capture the Palestinian village of Safsaf in the Galilee; afterwards, between 52 and 64 villagers are massacred by the IDF.
1953 – BCPA Flight 304 DC-6 crashes near San Francisco.
1955 – The  strikes a World War II mine in the harbor at Sevastopol.
1956 – Suez Crisis begins: Israeli forces invade the Sinai Peninsula and push Egyptian forces back toward the Suez Canal.
1957 – Israel's prime minister David Ben-Gurion and five of his ministers are injured when Moshe Dwek throws a grenade into the Knesset.
1960 – An airplane carrying the Cal Poly football team crashes on takeoff in Toledo, Ohio.
1964 – The United Republic of Tanganyika and Zanzibar is renamed to the United Republic of Tanzania.
  1964   – Biggest jewel heist; involving the Star of India (gem) in the American Museum of Natural History in New York City by Murph the Surf and gang.
1967 – Montreal's World Fair, Expo 67, closes with over 50 million visitors.
1969 – The first-ever computer-to-computer link is established on ARPANET, the precursor to the Internet.
1972 – The three surviving perpetrators of the Munich massacre are released from prison in exchange for the hostages of the hijacked Lufthansa Flight 615.
1980 – Demonstration flight of a secretly modified C-130 for an Iran hostage crisis rescue attempt ends in a crash landing at Eglin Air Force Base's Duke Field, Florida, leading to the cancellation of Operation Credible Sport.
1985 – Major General Samuel K. Doe is announced as the winner of the first multi-party election in Liberia.
1986 – British Prime Minister Margaret Thatcher opens the last stretch of the M25 motorway.
1991 – The American Galileo spacecraft makes its closest approach to 951 Gaspra, becoming the first probe to visit an asteroid.
1994 – Francisco Martin Duran fires over two dozen shots at the White House; he is later convicted of trying to kill U.S. President Bill Clinton.
1998 – In South Africa, the Truth and Reconciliation Commission presents its report, which condemns both sides for committing atrocities.
  1998   – Space Shuttle Discovery blasts off on STS-95 with 77-year-old John Glenn on board, making him the oldest person to go into space at that time.
  1998   – ATSC HDTV broadcasting in the United States is inaugurated with the launch of the STS-95 space shuttle mission.
  1998   – While en route from Adana to Ankara, a Turkish Airlines flight with a crew of six and 33 passengers is hijacked by a Kurdish militant who orders the pilot to fly to Switzerland. The plane instead lands in Ankara after the pilot tricked the hijacker into thinking that he is landing in the Bulgarian capital of Sofia to refuel.
  1998   – Hurricane Mitch, the second deadliest Atlantic hurricane in history, makes landfall in Honduras.
  1998   – The Gothenburg discothèque fire in Sweden kills 63 and injures 200.
1999 – A large cyclone devastates Odisha, India.
2002 – A fire destroys a luxurious department store in Ho Chi Minh City, where 1,500 people are shopping. More than 60 people die and over 100 are unaccounted for in the deadliest peacetime disaster in Vietnam.
2004 – The Arabic-language news network Al Jazeera broadcasts an excerpt from a 2004 Osama bin Laden video in which the terrorist leader first admits direct responsibility for the September 11, 2001 attacks and references the 2004 U.S. presidential election.
2005 – Bombings in Delhi, India kill more than 60.
2008 – Delta Air Lines merges with Northwest Airlines, creating the world's largest airline and reducing the number of US legacy carriers to five.
2008 – A pair of deadly earthquakes hits Baluchistan, Pakistan, killing 215.
2012 – Hurricane Sandy hits the east coast of the United States, killing 148 directly and 138 indirectly, while leaving nearly $70 billion in damages and causing major power outages.
2014 – A mud slide; the 2014 Badulla landslide, in south-central Sri Lanka, kills at least 16 people, and leaves hundreds of people missing.
2015 – China announces the end of its one-child policy after 35 years.
2018 – A Boeing 737 MAX plane crashes after taking off from Jakarta, Indonesia killing 189 people on board.
2020 – Jeremy Corbyn, Leader of the Labour Party and of the Opposition in the United Kingdom is suspended from the Labour Party following his response to findings from the EHRC on the issue of antisemitism within the party.
2022 – At least 156 die at a crowd crush during a Halloween celebration in Itaewon district, Seoul, South Korea.
2022 – At least 100 people are killed and over 300 are injured by a double car bombing in Mogadishu, Somalia.

Births

Pre-1600
1463 – Alessandro Achillini, Italian physician and philosopher (d. 1512)
1497 – Benedetto Accolti the Younger, Italian cardinal (d. 1549)
1504 – Shin Saimdang, South Korean painter and poet (d. 1551)
1507 – Fernando Alvarez de Toledo, Spanish general (d. 1582)
1562 – George Abbot, English archbishop and academic (d. 1633)

1601–1900
1682 – Pierre François Xavier de Charlevoix, French historian, explorer, and author (d. 1761)
1690 – Martin Folkes, English mathematician and astronomer (d. 1754)
1704 – John Byng, English admiral and politician, 11th Commodore Governor of Newfoundland (d. 1757)
1711 – Laura Bassi, Italian physicist and academic, first woman to have doctorate in science (d. 1778)
1740 – James Boswell, Scottish lawyer and author (d. 1795)
1808 – Caterina Scarpellini, Italian astronomer and meteorologist (d. 1873)
1812 – Louise Granberg, Swedish playwright (d. 1907)
1815 – Dan Emmett, American composer (d. 1904)
1822 – Mieczysław Halka-Ledóchowski, Russian-Polish cardinal (d. 1902)
1831 – James Boucaut, English-Australian politician, 11th Premier of South Australia (d. 1916)
1832 – Narcisa de Jesús, Ecuadorian saint (d. 1869)
1837 – Harriet Powers, American folk artist and quilter (d. 1910) 
1855 – Paul Bruchési, Canadian archbishop (d. 1939)
1856 – Jacques Curie, French physicist and academic (d. 1941)
1861 – Andrei Ryabushkin, Russian painter (d. 1904)
1866 – Antonio Luna, Filipino general and politician (d. 1899)
1875 – Marie of Romania (d. 1938)
1877 – Narcisa de Leon, Filipino film producer (d. 1966)
  1877   – Wilfred Rhodes, English cricketer and coach (d. 1973)
1879 – Alva B. Adams, American lawyer and politician (d. 1941)
  1879   – Franz von Papen, German soldier and politician, Chancellor of Germany (d. 1969)
1880 – Abram Ioffe, Russian physicist and academic (d. 1960)
1881 – John DeWitt, American football player and hammer thrower (d. 1930)
1882 – Jean Giraudoux, French author and playwright (d. 1944)
1883 – Victor Hochepied, French swimmer and water polo player (d. 1966)
1891 – Fanny Brice, American actress and singer (d. 1951)
1897 – Joseph Goebbels, German lawyer and politician, Chancellor of Nazi Germany (d. 1945)
  1897   – Billy Walker, English footballer (d. 1964)
1898 – Alan Barker, English soldier (d. 1984)
1899 – Akim Tamiroff, Georgian-American actor (d. 1972)

1901–present
1905 – Henry Green, English author (d. 1973)
1906 – Fredric Brown, American author (d. 1972)
1907 – Edwige Feuillère, French actress (d. 1998)
1910 – A. J. Ayer, English philosopher and author (d. 1989)
1913 – Al Suomi, American ice hockey player and referee (d. 2014)
1914 – Maxim of Bulgaria, Bulgarian patriarch (d. 2012)
1915 – William Berenberg, American physician and academic (d. 2005)
1918 – Bernard Gordon, American screenwriter and producer (d. 2007)
  1918   – Diana Serra Cary, American actress and author (d. 2020)
1920 – Baruj Benacerraf, Venezuelan-American physician and immunologist, Nobel Prize laureate (d. 2011)
  1920   – Václav Neumann, Czech violinist and conductor (d. 1995)
1921 – Baselios Thoma Didymos I, Indian metropolitan (d. 2014)
  1921   – Baku Mahadeva, Sri Lankan civil servant and academic (d. 2013)
  1921   – Bill Mauldin, American soldier and cartoonist (d. 2003)
1922 – Neal Hefti, American trumpet player and composer (d. 2008)
1923 – Carl Djerassi, Austrian-American chemist, author, and playwright (d. 2015)
  1923   – Gerda van der Kade-Koudijs, Dutch runner, hurdler, and long jumper (d. 2015)
1924 – Bernard Middleton, British restoration bookbinder (d. 2019)
1925 – Dominick Dunne, American journalist and author (d. 2009)
  1925   – Robert Hardy, English actor (d. 2017)
  1925   – Haim Hefer, Polish-Israeli songwriter and poet (d. 2012)
  1925   – Zoot Sims, American saxophonist and composer (d. 1985)
  1925   – Klaus Roth, British mathematician (d. 2015)
1926 – Jon Vickers, Canadian tenor and actor (d. 2015)
  1926   – Necmettin Erbakan, Turkish engineer and politician, 23rd Prime Minister of Turkey (d. 2011)
1927 – Frank Sedgman, Australian tennis player
1929 – Yevgeny Primakov, Ukrainian-Russian journalist and politician, 32nd Prime Minister of Russia (d. 2015)
1930 – Bertha Brouwer, Dutch sprinter (d. 2006)
  1930   – Niki de Saint Phalle, French sculptor and painter (d. 2002)
  1930   – Omara Portuondo, Cuban singer and dancer
  1930   – Natalie Sleeth, American pianist and composer (d. 1992)
1932 – Joyce Gould, Baroness Gould of Potternewton, English pharmacist and politician
1933 – William Harrison, American author and screenwriter (d. 2013)
1935 – David Allen, English cricketer (d. 2014)
  1935   – Eddie Hopkinson, English footballer (d. 2004)
  1935   – Michael Jayston, English actor
1937 – Sonny Osborne, American bluegrass singer and banjo player (d. 2021)
1938 – Ralph Bakshi, American director, producer, and screenwriter
  1938   – Ellen Johnson Sirleaf, Liberian politician, President of Liberia, Nobel Prize laureate
  1938   – Peter Stampfel, American fiddle player, violinist, and singer-songwriter
1940 – Connie Mack III, American lawyer and politician
  1940   – Jack Shepherd, English actor, director, and playwright
  1940   – Galen Weston, English-Canadian businessman and philanthropist, founded George Weston Limited (d. 2021)
1941 – George Davies, English fashion designer
  1941   – Paul Tyler, Baron Tyler, English politician
1942 – Lee Clayton, American rock/country musician and songwriter 
  1942   – Bob Ross, American painter and television host (d. 1995)
1943 – Don Simpson, American actor, producer, and screenwriter (d. 1996)
1944 – Claude Brochu, Canadian businessman
  1944   – Mehmet Haberal, Turkish surgeon and academic
  1944   – Denny Laine, English singer-songwriter and musician
  1944   – Robbie van Leeuwen, Dutch musician and songwriter 
1945 – Mick Gallagher, English keyboard player and songwriter 
  1945   – Ron Maag, American businessman and politician
  1945   – Melba Moore, American singer-songwriter and actress
  1945   – Gerrit Ybema, Dutch civil servant and politician (d. 2012)
1946 – Peter Green, English singer-songwriter and guitarist (d. 2020)
1947 – Helen Coonan, Australian lawyer and politician, 52nd Australian Minister for Communications
  1947   – Richard Dreyfuss, American actor and activist 
1948 – Frans de Waal, Dutch-American ethologist, author, and academic
  1948   – Kate Jackson, American actress, director, and producer
1949 – Kieron Baker, English footballer
  1949   – Paul Orndorff, American football player and wrestler (d. 2021)
  1949   – David Paton, Scottish guitarist 
  1949   – James Williamson, American guitarist, songwriter, and producer 
  1949   – Raphael Carl Lee, American surgeon and academic 
1950 – Abdullah Gül, Turkish academic and politician, 11th President of Turkey
1951 – Dirk Kempthorne, American businessman and politician, 49th United States Secretary of the Interior
  1951   – Tiff Needell, English race car driver and television host
1952 – Marcia Fudge, American lawyer and politician
1953 – Denis Potvin, Canadian ice hockey player and sportscaster
1955 – Kevin DuBrow, American heavy metal singer-songwriter (d. 2007)
1956 – Wilfredo Gómez, Puerto Rican-American boxer
1957 – Dan Castellaneta, American actor, voice artist, comedian, singer and producer
1958 – Blažej Baláž, Slovak painter, sculptor, and illustrator
  1958   – David Remnick, American journalist and author
1959 – Mike Gartner, Canadian ice hockey player and coach
  1959   – John Magufuli, Tanzanian politician, 5th President of Tanzania (d. 2021)
1960 – Fabiola Gianotti, Italian physicist and academic
  1960   – Thorsten Schlumberger, German footballer
1961 – Randy Jackson, American singer-songwriter and dancer
  1961   – Joel Otto, American ice hockey player and coach
1962 – Einar Örn Benediktsson, Icelandic singer, trumpet player, and politician 
1963 – Gerald Morris, American author
1964 – Yasmin Le Bon, English model
  1964   – Eddie McGuire, Australian businessman and television host
1965 – Tyler Collins, American singer-songwriter and actress
  1965   – Andrew Ettingshausen, Australian rugby league player and television host
  1965   – Michael Passons, American singer-songwriter
1966 – Mary Bucholtz, American linguist and academic
1967 – Thorsten Fink, German footballer and manager
  1967   – Joely Fisher, American actress and director
  1967   – Rufus Sewell, English actor
  1967   – Beth Chapman, American reality television star (d. 2019)
1968 – Johann Olav Koss, Norwegian speed skater and physician
1969 – David Farr, English director and playwright
  1969   – Chris Verene, American photographer
1970 – Phillip Cocu, Dutch footballer and manager
  1970   – Kaido Reivelt, Estonian physicist and academic
  1970   – Toby Smith, English keyboardist and songwriter (d. 2017) 
  1970   – Edwin van der Sar, Dutch footballer and sportscaster
1971 – Daniel J. Bernstein, American mathematician, cryptologist, and academic
  1971   – Greg Blewett, Australian cricketer, coach, and sportscaster
  1971   – Matthew Hayden, Australian cricketer
  1971   – Winona Ryder, American actress and producer
1972 – Takafumi Horie, Japanese businessman, founded Livedoor
  1972   – Tracee Ellis Ross, American actress and producer
  1972   – Gabrielle Union, American actress and producer
1973 – Adam Bacher, South African cricketer
  1973   – Vonetta Flowers, American bobsledder, sprinter, and long jumper
  1973   – Éric Messier, Canadian ice hockey player
  1973   – Robert Pires, French footballer
1974 – Michael Vaughan, English cricketer and sportscaster
  1974   – Yenny Wahid, Indonesian activist and politician
1975 – Kelly Lin, Chinese model and actress
  1975   – Baba Ali, Iranian-born American comedian, games developer, businessman, and actor
1976 – Stephen Craigan, Irish footballer and manager
  1976   – Milena Govich, American actress, singer, and dancer
  1976   – Raghava Lawrence, Indian actor, director, and choreographer
1977 – Jon Abrahams, American actor
  1977   – Brendan Fehr, Canadian actor
  1977   – Vaggelis Kaounos, Greek footballer
1978 – Travis Henry, American football player
  1978   – Kelly Smith, English footballer 
1979 – Andrew-Lee Potts, English actor, director, and producer
  1979   – Ignasi Giménez Renom, Catalan lawyer and politician
1980 – Ben Foster, American actor
  1980   – Nadejda Ostrovskaya, Belarusian tennis player
  1980   – Kaine Robertson, New Zealand-Italian rugby player
1981 – Amanda Beard, American swimmer
  1981   – Jonathan Brown, Australian footballer
  1981   – Angelika dela Cruz, Filipino actress and singer
  1981   – Georgios Fotakis, Greek footballer
1982 – Ariel Lin, Taiwanese actress and singer
  1982   – Chelan Simmons, Canadian model and actress
1983 – Richard Brancatisano, Australian actor
  1983   – Maurice Clarett, American football player
  1983   – Freddy Eastwood, Welsh footballer
  1983   – Dana Eveland, American baseball player
  1983   – Jérémy Mathieu, French footballer 
  1983   – Nurcan Taylan, Turkish weightlifter
1984 – Chris Baio, American bass player
  1984   – Les Davies, Welsh footballer
  1984   – Eric Staal, Canadian ice hockey player
  1984   – Lee Chung-ah, South Korean actress
1985 – Cal Crutchlow, English motorcycle racer
  1985   – Janet Montgomery, English actress and dancer
  1985   – Jefferson Severino, Brazilian footballer
  1985   – Vijender Singh, Indian boxer
1986 – Sarita Pérez de Tagle, Filipino actress
  1986   – Nataly Dawn, American singer
  1986   – Italia Ricci, Canadian actress
1987 – Andy Dalton, American football player
  1987   – Jessica Dubé, Canadian figure skater
  1987   – Tove Lo, Swedish singer
  1987   – Makoto Ogawa, Japanese singer and actress 
1988 – Florin Gardoș, Romanian footballer
  1988   – Sam Hutsby, English golfer
  1988   – Janoris Jenkins, American football player
  1988   – Roman Van Uden, New Zealand cyclist
 1989 – Irina Karamanos, Chilean anthropologist and political scientist, First Lady of Chile since 2022.
 1989 – Primož Roglič, Slovenian ski jumper and cyclist
1990 – Amarna Miller, former Spanish porn actress
  1990   – Eric Saade, Swedish singer 
1993 – Ágnes Bukta, Hungarian tennis player
  1993   – India Eisley, American actress
1996 – Astrid S, Norwegian singer and songwriter

Deaths

Pre-1600
1050 – Eadsige, archbishop of Canterbury
1266 – Margaret of Austria, Queen of Bohemia (b. c. 1204)
1268 – Conradin, king of Sicily (b. 1252)
  1268   – Frederick I, Margrave of Baden (b. 1249)
1321 – Stefan Milutin, King of Serbia (b. 1253)
1339 – Grand Prince Aleksandr Mikhailovich of Tver (b. 1301)
1590 – Dirck Coornhert, Dutch philosopher, theologian, and politician (b. 1522)

1601–1900
1618 – Walter Raleigh, English admiral, explorer, and politician, Lieutenant Governor of Jersey (b. 1554)
1650 – David Calderwood, Scottish historian and theologian (b. 1575)
1666 – Edmund Calamy the Elder, English minister and activist (b. 1600)
  1666   – James Shirley, English dramatist (b. 1596)
1783 – Jean le Rond d'Alembert, French mathematician, physicist, and philosopher (b. 1717)
1804 – Sarah Crosby, the first female Methodist preacher (b. 1729)
1829 – Maria Anna Mozart, Austrian pianist (b. 1751)
1871 – Andrea Debono, Maltese trader and explorer (b. 1821)
1877 – Nathan Bedford Forrest, American general and KKK leader (b. 1821)
1892 – William Harnett, American painter (b. 1848)
1897 – Henry George, American journalist, philosopher, and economist (b. 1839)

1901–present
1901 – Leon Czolgosz, American assassin of William McKinley (b. 1873)
1905 – Étienne Desmarteau, Canadian weight thrower and shot putter (b. 1873)
1911 – Joseph Pulitzer, Hungarian-American publisher, lawyer, and politician, founded Pulitzer, Inc. (b. 1847)
1916 – John Sebastian Little, American lawyer and politician, 21st Governor of Arkansas (b. 1851)
1918 – Rudolf Tobias, Estonian-German organist and composer (b. 1873)
1919 – Albert Benjamin Simpson, Canadian preacher, theologian, and author, founded the Christian and Missionary Alliance (b. 1843)
1924 – Frances Hodgson Burnett, English-American novelist and playwright (b. 1849)
1932 – Joseph Babinski, French neurologist and academic (b. 1857)
1933 – Albert Calmette, French physician, bacteriologist, and immunologist (b. 1863)
  1933   – George Luks, American painter and illustrator (b. 1867)
  1933   – Paul Painlevé, French mathematician and politician, 84th Prime Minister of France (b. 1853)
1936 – Ramiro de Maeztu, Spanish journalist and theorist (b. 1874)
1939 – Dwight B. Waldo, American historian and academic (b. 1864)
1941 – Harvey Hendrick, American baseball player (b. 1897)
1942 – Edward S. Anthoine, American politician and lawyer (b. 1882)
1949 – George Gurdjieff, Armenian-French monk, psychologist, and philosopher (b. 1872)
1950 – Gustaf V of Sweden (b. 1858)
1953 – William Kapell, American pianist (b. 1922)
1956 – Louis Rosier, French race car driver (b. 1905)
1957 – Louis B. Mayer, Belarusian-American production manager and producer (b. 1885)
1958 – Zoë Akins, American author, poet, and playwright (b. 1886)
1961 – Astrid Holm, Danish actress (b. 1893)
1963 – Adolphe Menjou, American actor (b. 1890)
1969 – Pops Foster, American bassist and trumpet player (b. 1892)
1971 – Duane Allman, American singer-songwriter and guitarist (b. 1946)
  1971   – Arne Tiselius, Swedish biochemist and academic, Nobel Prize laureate (b. 1902)
1977 – Chiyonoyama Masanobu, Japanese sumo wrestler, the 41st Yokozuna (b. 1926)
1980 – Giorgio Borġ Olivier, Maltese lawyer and politician, 7th Prime Minister of Malta (b. 1911)
1981 – Georges Brassens, French singer-songwriter and guitarist (b. 1921)
1986 – Mimis Fotopoulos, Greek actor, singer, and academic (b. 1913)
1987 – Woody Herman, American singer, clarinet player, saxophonist, and bandleader (b. 1913)
1988 – Kamaladevi Chattopadhyay, Indian author and activist (b. 1903)
1993 – Lipman Bers, Latvian-American mathematician and academic (b. 1914)
1994 – Shlomo Goren, Israeli rabbi, general, and scholar (b. 1918)
1995 – Terry Southern, American novelist, essayist, screenwriter,  (b. 1924)
1996 – Eugen Kapp, Estonian composer and educator (b. 1908)
1997 – Anton LaVey, American occultist, founded the Church of Satan (b. 1930)
  1997   – Andreas Gerasimos Michalitsianos, Greek-American astronomer and astrophysicist (b. 1947)
1998 – Paul Misraki, Turkish-French pianist and composer (b. 1908)
1999 – Greg, Belgian author and illustrator (b. 1931)
2000 – Carlos Guastavino, Argentinian pianist and composer (b. 1912)
2002 – Glenn McQueen, Canadian-American animator (b. 1960)
2003 – Hal Clement, American pilot, author, and educator (b. 1922)
  2003   – Franco Corelli, Italian tenor and actor (b. 1921)
2004 – Princess Alice, Duchess of Gloucester (b. 1901)
  2004   – Ordal Demokan, Turkish physicist and academic (b. 1946)
  2004   – Edward Oliver LeBlanc, Dominican lawyer and politician, Premier of Dominica (b. 1923)
  2004   – Peter Twinn, English mathematician and entomologist (b. 1916)
2005 – Lloyd Bochner, Canadian-American actor (b. 1924)
  2005   – Ion Irimescu, Romanian sculptor and illustrator (b. 1903)
2008 – Mike Baker, American singer-songwriter (b. 1963)
2011 – Jimmy Savile, English radio and television host (b. 1926)
2012 – Letitia Baldrige, American etiquette expert and author (b. 1926)
  2012   – J. Bernlef, Dutch author, poet, and songwriter (b. 1937)
  2012   – Kenneth G. Ryder, American academic (b. 1924)
  2012   – Wallace L. W. Sargent, English-American astronomer and academic (b. 1935)
  2012   – Jack Vaughn, American boxer and diplomat (b. 1920)
2013 – Jean Rénald Clérismé, Haitian priest and politician, Foreign Ministers of Haiti (b. 1937)
  2013   – Sherman Halsey, American director and producer (b. 1957)
  2013   – John Spence, American soldier and engineer (b. 1918)
  2013   – Graham Stark, English actor, director, producer, and screenwriter (b. 1922)
2014 – Roger Freeman, American lawyer and politician (b. 1965)
  2014   – Klas Ingesson, Swedish footballer and manager (b. 1968)
  2014   – H. Gary Morse, American businessman (b. 1936)
2015 – Luther Burden, American basketball player and coach (b. 1953)
  2015   – Ernesto Herrera, Filipino businessman and politician (b. 1942)
  2015   – Boris Kristančič, Slovene basketball player and coach (b. 1931)
  2015   – Ranko Žeravica, Serbian basketball player and coach (b. 1929)
2019 – John Witherspoon, American actor and comedian (b. 1942)
2021 – Ashley Mallett, Australian cricketer (b. 1945)

Holidays and observances
 Christian feast day:
 Abraham of Rostov
 Blessed Chiara Badano
 Colman mac Duagh
 Douai Martyrs
 Gaetano Errico
 James Hannington (Anglicanism)
 Narcissus of Jerusalem (Roman Catholic Church)
 October 29 (Eastern Orthodox liturgics)
 Coronation Day (Cambodia)
 Republic Day (Turkey) or Cumhuriyet Bayramı

References

External links

 
 
 

Days of the year
October